Manchu cuisine or Manchurian cuisine is the cuisine of Manchuria, the historical name for a region which now covers mostly Northeast China and Outer Manchuria. It uses the traditional Manchu staple foods of millet, soybean, peas, corn and broomcorn. It relies heavily on preserved foods (often pickling) due to the harsh winters and scorching summers in Northeast China. Manchu cuisine is also known for grilling, wild meat, strong flavours and the wide use of soy sauce. Manchu cuisine is more wheat based than Han Chinese cuisines.

History
The ancestors of the Manchus were the Jurchen and Mohe people. The Mohe enjoyed eating pork, practised pig farming extensively, and were mainly sedentary, and also used both pig and dog skins for coats. They were predominantly farmers who grew soybean, wheat, millet and rice, in addition to engaging in hunting.

In contrast with their Mohe ancestors, the Jurchens developed respect for dogs around the time of the Ming dynasty and passed this tradition to their Manchu descendants. In Jurchen culture, it was forbidden to use dog skin and harm, kill or eat dogs. The Jurchens also believed that the Koreans' use of dog skin was an "utmost evil". The Koreans' consumption of dog meat set them apart from the Manchus.

The Manchu Han Imperial Feast includes many notable dishes in Manchu cuisine. This banquet combined the best cuisine from the Manchus, Han Chinese, Mongols, Hui people and Tibetans. It included 108 dishes (of which 54 are northern dishes and 54 are southern dishes) that would be eaten over three days. The Manchu palace banquets were subdivided into six grades. The first, second and third grades were prepared for deceased imperial ancestors. The fourth grade food was served to the imperial family during the Lunar New Year and other festivals. The fifth and sixth grades were served on all other occasions.

Notable dishes in Manchu cuisine
The typical Manchu dishes include pickled vegetables. Manchurian hot pot is a traditional dish, made with pickled Chinese cabbage, pork and mutton.

Bairou xuechang is a soup with pork and blood sausage and pickled Chinese cabbage.

Suziyie doubao is a steamed bun, stuffed with sweetened, mashed beans and wrapped with perilla leaves outside.

Sachima is a candied fritter similar to Tatar Çäkçäk, which is a very popular sweet.

Other common dishes are: 

 suancai cuan bairou (sour vegetables with boiled meat), 
 suan tangzi (a sour soup with fermented corn flour), 
 di san xian (stir-fried eggplant, potato and green pepper), 
 Manchu sausage, ludagun (a steamed roll made of bean flour), and 
 niushe bing (a type of cake).

Manchurian/Manchow dishes in India
The popular Indian Chinese style of cooking known as Manchurian, where an ingredient is first deep-fried and then sauteed in a spicy sauce, was invented in India and bears little if any relation to actual Manchu cooking.  Manchow soup is also an Indian creation.

References 

 
Regional cuisines of China